Daniel Turner may refer to:

 Daniel Turner (physician) (1667–1741), English physician who first noted the Auspitz's sign
 Daniel Turner (naval officer) (1794–1850), United States Navy officer
 Daniel Turner (North Carolina politician) (1796–1860), United States representative for North Carolina
 Daniel Webster Turner (1877–1969), American soldier and governor of Iowa
 Daniel Turner (hymn writer) (1710–1798), English teacher, Baptist minister and hymn-writer
 Daniel Turner (artist) (born 1983), American visual artist
 Daniel Turner (footballer) (born 2002), Australian rules footballer

See also
 Dan Turner (disambiguation)